The Zil tribal confederation constitutes a number of Kurmanji (Northern Kurdish) tribes that mostly live within modern Turkey.

Zil tribes
The following is a list of the Kurmanji speaking Kurdish tribes of the Zil tribal Federation

Ademan 
Burukan 
Celali 
Dakuri/Takori
Epdoyi 
Hasanan 
Hayderan 
Milan 
Şadili 
Semsi 
Torular
Zirkan/Zirqan

Position on the Sheikh Said rebellion
The Zil tribal federation didn't join the Sheikh Said rebellion, many tribes fought on the side of the government.

See also
 Sheikh Said rebellion
 Kurdish chiefdoms
 Kurdish tribes
 Kurmanji

References

Sources